"Nanana" is a song by European-American pop group The Kelly Family. It was produced by Kathy and Paddy Kelly for their ninth studio album Almost Heaven (1996) and features lead vocals by Jimmy Kelly. The song reached the top ten of the Swiss Singles Chart and peaked at number 17 in Germany. In support of their comeback compilation album We Got Love (2007), "Na Na Na" was re-released as a single in March 2017, this time again with Jimmy on the lead vocals.

Track listings

Charts

References

External links
 KellyFamily.de — official site

1996 songs
The Kelly Family songs